Cosmosoma tarapotensis is a moth of the subfamily Arctiinae. It was described by Herbert Druce in 1897. It is found in Peru and Brazil.

References

tarapotensis
Moths described in 1897